This is a timeline of the Northern Yuan dynasty.

14th century

15th century

16th century

17th century

References

Bibliography
 

 
 

 
Timelines of Chinese dynasties
History of Mongolia
 
Lists of khans
Northern Yuan